South Caicos Airport  is an airport serving South Caicos, the seventh largest of the Turks and Caicos Islands.

Facilities

Airlines and destinations

References

External links
 

Airports in the Turks and Caicos Islands